Eutreta sparsa is a species of tephritid or fruit flies in the genus Eutreta of the family Tephritidae.

Distribution
Brazil.

References

Tephritinae
Insects described in 1830
Diptera of South America